Larijan Hot Spring or Larijan Mineral Spring or Rineh Thermal Spring (Abe garm-e-Ma'dani-e-Larijan) is a Hot mineral spring located about  south of Amol,  Iran, near Mount Damavand.

It has several individual bathtubs and some public pools for visitors and bathroom. For tourists, there is hotel and motel and other residence. Larijan Hot Spring is one of the main attractions of the Mazandaran province, Iran. The main center spring in Rineh.

References

External links 

Hot springs of Iran
Tourist attractions in Amol
Tourist attractions in Mazandaran Province
Landforms of Iran
Landforms of Mazandaran Province